A novella is a written, fictional, prose narrative longer than a novelette but shorter than a novel. 

Novella may also refer to:

Arts, entertainment, and media
 The Novella, a 1653 play by Richard Brome
 Novella (album), a 1977 album by Renaissance
 "Novella", a song by Funeral for a Friend from Casually Dressed & Deep in Conversation

People
 Steven Novella (born 1964), American neurologist and skeptic
 Novella Calligaris (born 1954), Italian swimmer
 Novella Carpenter, American writer
 Novella d'Andrea (died 1333), Italian legal scholar
 Novella Nelson (1939–2017), American actress and singer
 Novella Jewell Trott (1846–1929), American author and editor

Other uses
 Novella, Haute-Corse, a commune in France
 A type of Roman law, see Novel (Roman law)
Novellae Constitutiones or The Novels, laws passed by Byzantine Emperor Justinian I

See also
 Novel (disambiguation)
 Novella 2000, an Italian magazine